Péter Haumann (17 May 1941 – 28 May 2022) was a Hungarian actor. He appeared in more than one hundred films since 1962.

Selected filmography

References

External links 

1941 births
2022 deaths
Hungarian male film actors
Male actors from Budapest
Hungarian theatre directors
20th-century Hungarian male actors
21st-century Hungarian male actors
Artists of Merit of the Hungarian People's Republic